Bebryce is a genus of gorgonian-type octocorals in the family Plexauridae.

Species
The World Register of Marine Species lists the following species:

Bebryce asteria Bayer & van Ofwegen, 2016
Bebryce bocki Aurivillius, 1931
Bebryce boninensis Aurivillius, 1931
Bebryce brunnea (Nutting, 1908)
Bebryce cactus Bayer, 1994
Bebryce cinerea Deichmann, 1936
Bebryce cofferi Bayer & van Ofwegen, 2016
Bebryce crucifera (Bayer, 1981)
Bebryce densa Tixier-Durivault, 1972
Bebryce grandicalyx Kükenthal, 1924
Bebryce grandis Deichmann, 1936
Bebryce harpy Grasshoff, 1999
Bebryce hicksoni Thomson & Henderson, 1905
Bebryce indica Thomson, 1905
Bebryce inermis Samimi Namin & van Ofwegen, 2010
Bebryce mollis Philippi, 1842
Bebryce otsuchiensis Matsumoto & van Ofwegen, 2016
Bebryce parastellata Deichmann, 1936
Bebryce philippii Studer, 1889
Bebryce rigida Tixier-Durivault, 1972
Bebryce rotunda Matsumoto & van Ofwegen, 2016
Bebryce satsumaensis Matsumoto & van Ofwegen, 2016
Bebryce sirene Grasshoff, 1999
Bebryce studeri Whitelegge, 1897
Bebryce sulfurea Grasshoff, 2000
Bebryce tenuis Thomson & Simpson, 1909
Bebryce thomsoni Nutting, 1910

References

Plexauridae
Octocorallia genera